The spottail pinfish (Diplodus holbrookii) is an ocean-going species of fish in the family Sparidae. It is also known as the Spottail seabream. Along with other members of their family, Spottail pinfish are occasionally eaten and considered by some to be a panfish.

Taxonomy and naming

The Spottail pinfish was described in 1878 by Tarleton Hoffman Bean, an ichthyologist who worked mainly on the Connecticut coast. He originally placed it in the genus Sargus, but it was later moved to Diplodus. Bean named the Spottail pinfish after John Edwards Holbrook, a zoologist who had died 7 years before.

Description
Spottail pinfish are almost totally gray in color, with a large, black spot on the distal end of the caudal peduncle. This is similar to other members of its genus, Diplodus annularis and Diplodus sargus -though D. sargus has several vertical bars that the Spottail pinfish does not.

Distribution and habitat
Spottail pinfish are exclusive to the western Atlantic ocean. They can be found from Chesapeake bay to southern Florida. Spottail pinfish are also known from the northern Gulf of Mexico, but are not known from the West Indies. There are only questionable reports from Cuba.

Spottail pinfish are common to shallow waters (only as deep as 28m) near coasts, such as bays and harbors, though only rarely in brackish areas. They prefer flat, vegetated bottoms such as beds of sea grass, where they feed on a mixture of plants (such as Thalassia) and small invertebrates.

Behavior
Spottail pinfish school in small numbers, but generally mix with many other species such as the Porkfish,
Gray snapper, Bluestriped grunt, Sailor's grunt, and the Bucktooth parrotfish.

Fishing
Spottail pinfish readily eat several baits such as shrimp (live or artificial), squid, and clams. Usually they are a pest fish when trying to catch a larger fish.

References

External links
 

spotted pinfish
Fauna of the Southeastern United States
Fish of the Gulf of Mexico
spotted pinfish